Versus is the sixth studio album by Swedish metal band The Haunted. It was released on 17 September 2008. This marks a return to their aggressive sounds in the previous albums after their experimental fifth album The Dead Eye. All instruments were recorded live like their debut album, The Haunted, and solos and vocals were added once they had the songs down. The album is more or less about the decadence of mankind as last two songs "Faultline" and "Imperial Death March" point it out.

Track listing

Note
 "Meat Wagon" is the only song on Japanese issue that is not on the special edition issue while the rest of the songs are.

Credits 
Peter Dolving – vocals & lyrics
Patrik Jensen – rhythm guitar
Anders Björler – lead guitar
Jonas Björler – bass
Per Möller Jensen – drums

Release history

References 

2008 albums
The Haunted (Swedish band) albums
Century Media Records albums
Albums produced by Tue Madsen